Leonard Stone (born Leonard Steinbock; November 3, 1923 – November 2, 2011) was an American character actor who played supporting roles in over 120 television shows and 35 films.

Early years
Stone was born in Salem, Oregon. The son of Mr. and Mrs. Mike Steinbock, he was a graduate of Salem High School. He majored in speech and drama at Willamette University, graduating cum laude.

Military service
He was a midshipman during training with the U.S. Navy, going on to serve as "skipper on a minesweeper in Japanese waters."

Stage 
Stone started his career as a young actor studying at the Royal Academy of Dramatic Art in London He performed in the West End, on Broadway, and toured the world. He traveled for eight years in Australia and New Zealand with the musical South Pacific.

He won a Tony Award in 1959 for Best Supporting Actor in Redhead, a Bob Fosse musical. He also was in the Tony Award-nominated cast of Look Homeward, Angel in 1957, which premiered at the Ethel Barrymore Theater in New York. The play, based on the Thomas Wolfe novel, won the Pulitzer Prize.

Film and television
One of Stone's more notable film roles came in 1971, when he played Mr. Beauregarde, the father of Golden Ticket winner Violet Beauregarde (played by Denise Nickerson), in Willy Wonka & the Chocolate Factory.  He was the last surviving adult character who toured the factory in the movie, but Diana Sowle, who played Mrs. Bucket, was still alive at the time of his death. In 1973's Soylent Green, he played Charles, the manager of the building where the murdered character portrayed by Joseph Cotten lived.

He appeared in the Jerry Lewis vehicle The Big Mouth in 1967. Other films he appeared in include The Mugger (1958), A Man Called Dagger (1968), Angel in My Pocket (1969), Zig Zag (1970), Getting Straight (1970), I Love My Wife (1970), Mame (1974), and The Man from Independence (1974).

Stone appeared in the TV movies The Ghost of Sierra de Cobra (1964), A Step Out of Line (1971), Terror in the Sky (1971), Beg, Borrow or Steal (1973), The Runaways (1975), The Girl in the Empty Grave (1977), The Other Side of Hell (1978), Zuma Beach (1978), See Arnold Run (2005), and Surrender, Dorothy (2006).

Between 1961 and 1985, Stone appeared in dozens of popular American television series, including Peter Gunn, The Untouchables, Gunsmoke (five times), The Rifleman (twice), The Defenders, The Real McCoys (twice), The Outer Limits, Dr. Kildare (twice), McHale's Navy, Rawhide (twice), The F.B.I., The Doris Day Show, The High Chaparral, Lost in Space (twice), Gomer Pyle: USMC (twice), Dragnet 1967 (five times), The Partridge Family, Nanny and the Professor, Mod Squad, The Virginian, Love, American Style (twice), The Waltons, Mission: Impossible (three times), Adam-12, Barney Miller (five times), Hawaii Five-O, Ironside (three times), Kojak, Mannix (four times), Police Story (twice), Cannon, The Blue Knight, The Bob Newhart Show, Sanford and Son, M*A*S*H, Eight Is Enough, The Six Million Dollar Man, All in the Family, The Dukes of Hazzard, General Hospital, One Day at a Time, Quincy M.E. (four times), Cagney & Lacey, Alice (four times), Night Court, Hill Street Blues (twice), Falcon Crest (three times), Simon & Simon, and L.A. Law (10 times).

In 1961 and 1962, Stone was cast twice in different roles on The Real McCoys in the episodes "Money from Heaven" and "You Can't Beat the Army". Between 1962 and 1966, Stone made four guest appearances on Perry Mason, including his season-six, 1962 role as murderer Jerel Leland in "The Case of the Hateful Hero".

Stone played Farnum the Great in two episodes of Lost in Space (1965-1968).. He appeared twice on  The Donna Reed Show, as Mr. Trestle in "The Good Guys and the Bad Guys" (1961) and as Harlan Carmody, Jr., in "Joe College" (1965). In the 1965–1966 season, he appeared as Doc Joslyn on Camp Runamuck. In 1967, he had the role of Judge Gilroy in Cimarron Strip. In 1971, Stone appeared as Tom Wagner on The Men from Shiloh (rebranded name for The Virginian) in the episode titled "The Town Killer".

Between 1988 and 1994, he was cast as Judge Paul Hansen in 10 episodes of L.A. Law.

On September 22, 2000, he appeared on an episode of Wheel of Fortune.

Stone's final role came in 2006 at the age of 83, when he played a minor character in the TV movie Surrender Dorothy.

Death 
Stone died on November 2, 2011, in Encinitas, California after suffering a brief bout with cancer, just one day before his 88th birthday.

Filmography 
 

The Mugger (1958) as Jim Kelly
Return to Peyton Place (1961) as Steve Swanson (uncredited)
Toys in the Attic (1963) as Hotel Clerk (uncredited)
Shock Treatment (1964) as Psychiatrist (uncredited)
The Big Mouth (1967) as Fong
A Man Called Dagger (1968) as Karl Rainer
The Shakiest Gun in the West (1968) as Bartender (uncredited)
Angel in My Pocket (1969) as Paul Gresham
Zig Zag (1970) as Jim Harris
Getting Straight (1970) as Lysander
I Love My Wife (1970) as Dr. Neilson
Willy Wonka & the Chocolate Factory (1971) as Sam Beauregarde
Terror in the Sky (1971) as Harry Burdick
The Man (1972) as Congressman Parmel
Soylent Green (1973) as Charles
Mame (1974) as Stage Manager
The Man from Independence (1974) as Werner
Hardly Working (1980) as Ted Mitchell
American Pop (1981) as Leo Stern (voice)
Nankyoku Monogatari (1983) as Narrator
See Arnold Run (2005) as Warren Buffett
Surrender Dorothy (2006) as Neighbor

Television

 The Rifleman (1960-1962) as Gambler/K.C. Peters
 The Untouchables (1961) as Louis Manzak
 The Real McCoys (1961-1962) as Lieutenant/Captain Lewis
 Perry Mason (1962-1966) as Various Roles
 The Outer Limits (1963) as Dr. Phillip Gainer
 Dr. Kildare (1963-1964) as Fred Payson
 Gunsmoke (1963-1974) as Various Roles
 Rawhide (1964-1965) as Sorry Brownstead/Leroy Means
 Mission: Impossible (1966-1972) as Various Roles
 The F.B.I. (1967) as Harry Palmer
 The Virginian (1971) as Tom Wagner 
 The Waltons (1972) as George Anderson
The Six Million Dollar Man (1974) as Lt. Tanner 
 Sanford and Son (1972-1976) as Otto/Mr. Grayson
 The Bob Newhart Show (1976) as Dr. Ned Podbillion
 M*A*S*H (1977) as Colonel Bidwell
 The Dukes of Hazzard (1980) as Cosgroves' Man
 Barney Miller (1981) as Mr. Lun
 General Hospital         (1982) as Packy/Packie/Packey(sp)
 Falcon Crest (1983-1985) as Harrison Albright/Judge Carl Fuller
 L.A. Law (1988-1994) as Judge Paul Hansen
 Days of Our Lives (1990) as Judge Randolph 
 Avatar: The Last Airbender (2005) as Canyon Guide (voice)

References

External links 
 
 
 

1923 births
2011 deaths
Alumni of RADA
American male film actors
American male musical theatre actors
American male stage actors
American male television actors
Tony Award winners
American people of Russian-Jewish descent
Deaths from cancer in California
Contestants on American game shows
Male actors from Salem, Oregon
20th-century American male actors
21st-century American male actors